Gilli Rólantsson Sørensen (born 11 August 1992) is a Faroese professional footballer who plays for Norwegian club Odd and the Faroe Islands national team.

Career
He has earlier played for TB Tvøroyri, B36 Tórshavn, AaB and the Scottish U19 team of Aberdeen F.C. He was the captain of the Faroese U21 national football team.

On 10 February 2021 he signed a two-year deal with Norwegian Eliteserien club Odd.

Career statistics

Club

International goals
Scores and results list the Faroe Islands' goal tally first.

Honours

Club
AaB
Danish Superliga (1): 2013–14
Danish Cup (1): 2013–14

References

External links
 
 UEFA under 21

 

1992 births
Living people
Association football forwards
Faroese footballers
Faroe Islands international footballers
Faroese expatriate footballers
AaB Fodbold players
SK Brann players
Danish Superliga players
Eliteserien players
Faroese expatriate sportspeople in Norway
Expatriate men's footballers in Denmark
Expatriate footballers in Norway
People from Tvøroyri
Faroe Islands youth international footballers